Stephen Ray Perry (born January 22, 1949) is an American singer and songwriter. He was the lead singer of the rock band Journey during their most commercially successful periods from 1977 to 1987, and again from 1995 to 1998. He also wrote/co-wrote several of Journey’s hit songs. Perry had a successful solo career between the mid-1980s and mid-1990s, made sporadic appearances in the 2000s, and returned to music full-time in 2018.

Perry's singing voice has garnered acclaim from prominent musical peers and publications; he has been dubbed The Voice, a moniker originally coined by Jon Bon Jovi. Ranked No. 76 on Rolling Stones "100 Greatest Singers of All Time", Perry was inducted into the Rock and Roll Hall of Fame as a member of Journey on April 7, 2017.

Early life
Stephen Ray Perry was born in Hanford, California, to Portuguese parents from the Azores. He is an only child. Perry grew up interested in music, as his father, Raymond Perry (Pereira), was a vocalist and co-owner of radio station KNGS. Perry's parents ended their relationship when he was eight. He and his mother then moved to his grandparents' dairy farm.

On Perry's 12th birthday, his mother, Mary Quaresma, presented him with a gold eighth note pendant; Perry wears the pendant for good luck. At age 12, Perry heard Sam Cooke's song "Cupid" on his mother's car radio, and it inspired him to become a singer.

Music career

Early career
In his early 20s, Perry moved to Sacramento to start a band with 16-year-old future music producer Scott Mathews, who co-wrote, played drums and guitar and sang. That band, Ice, wrote original material and were poised for success in the music business. In 1972, they recorded at the Record Plant studios in Los Angeles by day while Stevie Wonder recorded his Talking Book album by night. Upon returning to Sacramento, Ice disbanded as the band had no management, Mathews was still in high school, and the recordings went virtually unheard. In 1975, Perry moved to Thousand Oaks, California, where he formed a progressive rock band called Pieces with Tim Bogert (who had previously worked with Jeff Beck), Denver Cross, and Eddie Tuduri. After a year and a half, the group was unable to secure a record deal and disbanded. Perry also unsuccessfully auditioned to replace Rod Evans in Captain Beyond.

Perry then ended up in Banta, California, outside of Tracy, California, where he fronted the band Alien Project in his mid-20s. He nearly gave up music when the bassist of that band, Richard Michaels, was killed in an automobile accident. Perry returned to Lemoore and decided not to continue his singing career, but at the urging of his mother, he answered a call from Walter "Herbie" Herbert, manager of struggling San Francisco-based band Journey.

Journey era

Original Journey organizer/manager Herbert had been given a demo of an Alien Project song, "If You Need Me, Call Me", and was told by producer Scott Mathews that the young singer would be a great replacement for then-current frontman Robert Fleischman. Fleischman had never signed with Herbert's company (preferring his previous manager) and had not fully coalesced with the band's then progressive rock style. Perry was brought on tour and to avoid alarming Fleischman was referred to as a roadie's Portuguese cousin. During a sound check in Long Beach, Perry surreptitiously performed a song with Journey while Fleischman was away from the stage; soon thereafter, Herbert informed the band members that Perry was the new lead singer.

Perry brought a radically new, more pop-influenced style sense to the band's music, despite some grumblings from the band's existing members and fans of Journey's progressive rock sound. He made his public debut on October 28, 1977, in San Francisco to a mixed reception. Perry eventually won over new fans on his first album with the group, Infinity, which included a song he wrote called "Lights." The band's style had changed dramatically, but as Journey began to garner airplay and media buzz over Infinity, Perry's arrival was fully accepted.

Perry provided lead vocals on nine of Journey's albums: Infinity (1978), Evolution (1979), Departure (1980), Dream, After Dream (1980, a Japanese movie soundtrack), Captured (1980, a live album), Escape (1981, which reached No. 1 on the Billboard chart), Frontiers (1983), Raised on Radio (1986), and Trial By Fire (1996). The single "Open Arms" from Escape was their biggest hit single, charting at No. 2 for six weeks on the Billboard Hot 100.

During his Journey tenure, Perry also sang backing vocals on several Sammy Hagar songs, including the 1980 tracks "The Iceman" (a nickname Hagar had for Scott Mathews) and "Run For Your Life", and duetting with Kenny Loggins on the 1982 No. 17 hit single "Don't Fight It".

In 1984, following the release of Frontiers and the tour supporting this effort, Perry released his first solo album, Street Talk (the album's title was derived from the original name of Perry's earlier band Alien Project). The record sold more than 2 million units, scoring the hit singles No. 3 "Oh Sherrie", written for his then-girlfriend Sherrie Swafford, and No. 18 "Foolish Heart". The music video for "Oh Sherrie" saw heavy rotation on MTV. "She's Mine" and "Strung Out" were also released as singles from this project, which featured former Alien Project drummer Craig Krampf on a few tracks, guitarist Michael Landau, and future American Idol judge Randy Jackson on bass, among others.

In 1985, Perry was one of 21 singers on the USA for Africa all-star benefit song "We Are the World". He also recorded a song, "If Only For the Moment, Girl" for the We Are the World album. This song was added to the reissue of his album Street Talk. Also during this period, Perry worked with the Irish folk-rock group Clannad on their 1987 album Sirius.

While Perry was reuniting with Journey, his mother became ill. The recording of Raised on Radio, which Perry was producing, was stop-and-go as he frequently returned to the San Joaquin Valley to visit his mother, who died during the production of the album. It took a major toll on Journey to have intermittent recording sessions and a vocalist who was not with the band much of the time. Eventually, Perry became exhausted from the ordeal. Journey then went into hiatus in 1987 after the Raised on Radio tour.

In 1988, Perry began to work on another solo album, Against the Wall, which he ultimately left unfinished (though several of the songs that were recorded for Against the Wall would appear on Perry's 1998 solo compilation, Greatest Hits + Five Unreleased). A year later, on April 30, 1989, at the Shoreline Amphitheatre, in Mountain View, California, Perry joined Bon Jovi to perform Sam Cooke's "Bring It On Home to Me" and the Four Tops' "Reach Out". He would also reunite with Journey at the Bill Graham tribute concert, "Laughter, Love and Music" on November 3, 1991, at Golden Gate Park in San Francisco, performing "Faithfully" and "Lights". Other than those three events, however, Perry mostly disappeared from the public eye for seven years, taking a break from the music industry.

In 1994, Perry released For the Love of Strange Medicine, his second solo effort. The album was successful, partly due to the Strange Medicine world tour.

Journey's classic 1981–85 lineup reunited in 1996 to record Trial by Fire. The album was a huge success, entering the Billboard charts at No. 3 and going platinum before year's end, but its triumph was short-lived. Before the Trial By Fire tour could begin, Perry suffered a hip injury while hiking in Hawaii and was unable to perform. Perry was diagnosed with a degenerative bone condition and a hip replacement was required, and as he was reluctant to rush into the surgery, Perry wanted to postpone the tour. The remaining members waited until 1998, nearly 17 months after Perry's injury, before making a decision on Journey's future. Growing impatient and realizing the window of opportunity was closing to follow up the success of the Trial By Fire LP with a world tour, Journey members Jonathan Cain and Neal Schon met with Perry. They presented him with an ultimatum: If he did not undergo hip replacement surgery so the tour could proceed upon his recovery, the band would hire a replacement singer. Still hesitant to undergo surgery, and now upset at his bandmates, Perry announced that he was permanently leaving Journey. His lead vocal duties were later taken over by Steve Augeri of Tall Stories. Nearly two years after the initial release of Trial by Fire, Journey began to tour.

Perry released his Greatest Hits + Five Unreleased compilation album on December 15, 1998; the unreleased tracks included an original Alien Project demo as well as selections from the abandoned Against the Wall album. Also in 1998, Perry recorded two songs for the Warner Bros. film Quest for Camelot, which can be found on the motion picture's soundtrack. During an episode of VH1's Behind the Music in 2001, Perry stated that he "never really felt like [he] was part of the band". Former manager Herbie Herbert reacted by saying "That's like the Pope saying he never really felt Catholic."

21st century
Perry appeared on two tracks by Kauai, Hawaii, artist Tommy Tokioka's album Happy To Be Living, singing backup vocals on songs "I Wish You Were Mine" and "An Angel Above Me" in 2000. He collaborated with musician Jeff Golub on a song entitled "Can't Let You Go" for Golub's Soul Sessions album, which was released in 2003. Perry provided vocals on the mostly instrumental jazz track.

Perry appeared with other Journey members at a ceremony on the Hollywood Walk of Fame on January 21, 2005, after previously stating it was unlikely that he would ever stand with the band again. He indicated that, though it was a good experience, it was unlikely that he would rejoin the band. However, he has also said, "[n]ever say never, unless you mean never, nevertheless" when the issue of returning to Journey has been mentioned.

Perry co-produced "A Brand New Start", a track on a solo album for former Ambrosia lead vocalist David Pack, in 2005. Perry also provided co-vocals and background vocals for the track, among the many songs he and Pack co-wrote shortly after the September 11, 2001 attacks. That album, The Secret of Moving On, released in September 2005, includes covers of two of Pack's biggest hits with Ambrosia, "Biggest Part of Me" and "You're the Only Woman."

On October 3, 2006, Perry's two solo projects, Street Talk and For the Love of Strange Medicine (both featuring previously unreleased material), and his Greatest Hits CD were remastered and re-released. Sony Legacy released Playlist: The Very Best of Steve Perry on January 13, 2009.

At three concerts in 2014, Perry joined the indie rock band Eels during the encore and sang several songs.

On April 7, 2017, Perry appeared alongside his Journey ex-bandmates for the first time since 2005 at the band's induction into the Rock and Roll Hall of Fame. Perry gave an acceptance speech, but chose not to perform with the band in deference to current Journey lead singer Arnel Pineda.

Perry released a 10-track studio album, Traces, on October 5, 2018. A US Deluxe Edition was released at Target and has five bonus tracks. Perry has described the album as a "cathartic" and "emotional expression" about the loss of a loved one. The record is Perry's third studio work and his first since For the Love of Strange Medicine.

On December 17, 2018, Perry released a cover of "Have Yourself a Merry Little Christmas."

In March 2019, Perry released a deluxe version of the Traces album, featuring five bonus tracks along with his first official music video in 25 years for "We're Still Here".

Perry released a three-song holiday EP on November 1, 2019, Silver Bells.

On November 5, 2021, Perry released his first-ever Christmas album, The Season, via Fantasy Records.

On January 4, 2023, Perry confirmed that he would sing backing vocals on Dolly Parton's upcoming rock album in addition to singing a duet cover of "Open Arms" on the same album.

Vocal style and acclaim
Perry is renowned for his countertenor vocal range, which spans from F2 to A5. Perry's voice has been described as a "high 'tenor altino' [with] a tone somewhere between Sam Cooke and Aretha Franklin." He has been dubbed "The Voice", a moniker originally coined by fellow singer Jon Bon Jovi. Queen guitarist Brian May said: "Perry is a truly luminous singer, in my opinion—a voice in a million." Record executive, producer, and former American Idol judge and Journey session musician Randy Jackson has described Perry's voice as "the golden voice," adding that aside from Robert Plant, "there's no singer in rock that even came close to Steve Perry. The power, the range, the tone—he created his own style. He mixed a little Motown, a little Everly Brothers, a little Zeppelin." Journey guitarist Neal Schon likened Perry's ability to that of Aretha Franklin, and agreed with Fozzy vocalist Chris Jericho's assertion that Perry "might be the greatest male singer of all time".

Greg Prato of AllMusic wrote: "If only one singer could be selected as the most identifiable with '80s arena rock, it would have to be Journey's Steve Perry." Prato's colleague John Franck praised Perry's as a soaring "whale of a voice". He was voted among the ten greatest rock singers of all time in a 2009 Classic Rock reader poll. Rolling Stone ranked Perry No. 76 in "The 100 Greatest Singers of All Time," lauding his "technical skills" as well as his "pure tone and passionate sincerity." Geoff Nicholls of Rhythm referred to Perry as "arguably the best singer of his generation".

Sam Cooke, to whom Perry has been compared, was Perry's primary influence. He has also cited the vocal approach of The Beach Boys, Jackie Wilson, Frankie Valli, Lou Christie, Marvin Gaye, Joe Tex, and Jack Bruce of Cream, along with female singers such as Diana Ross, Dee Dee Sharp and Aretha Franklin. Musically, Perry drew influence from Elvis Presley and Chuck Berry. He also spoke of his fondness for Motown recordings and English bands of the late 1960s.

Songwriting
Perry was a principal songwriter for most of Journey's songs throughout his tenure with the band, as well as his solo efforts. These efforts led to a nomination to the Songwriter's Hall of Fame 2020.

Personal life
In the 1980s Perry dated Sherrie Swafford, for whom he wrote the 1984 song "Oh Sherrie".

In 2011, Perry began a relationship with psychologist and breast cancer survivor Kellie Nash. He was by Nash's side as she battled a cancer recurrence, and she died in December 2012.

In a September 2018 interview, Perry said, "Things happened to me as a child that I still can't talk about – nothing to do with my parents, but things did happen. It happened to a lot of kids, as I find out... there was nowhere to talk it out, so I got to sing it out instead."

In a 2019 interview with Dan Rather, Perry discussed that he has a daughter and grandchildren, but declined to go into further details saying, "I do have a child, but in the essence of protecting her, I kinda don't want to get into that...and I have grandchildren too."

Health and interests 
Perry underwent successful hip replacement surgery in 1998.

In May 2013, Perry had a mole removed that turned out to be melanoma. He had two surgeries to remove the cancer cells and was told the surgeries were successful, requiring no further treatment.

During the 2005 baseball season, the Chicago White Sox adopted Journey's "Don't Stop Believin' as their unofficial team anthem. As a result, Perry (a San Francisco Giants fan) was asked to attend the World Series and traveled with the White Sox to Houston, where Perry joined the players on the field and in the locker room as they celebrated their championship.

Discography

Studio albums

With Journey 

 Infinity (1978)
 Evolution (1979)
 Departure (1980)
 Dream, After Dream (1980)
 Escape (1981)
 Frontiers (1983)
 Raised on Radio (1986)
 Trial by Fire (1996)

Solo

Compilation albums

Solo 
 Greatest Hits + Five Unreleased (1998)
 Playlist: The Very Best of Steve Perry (2009)
 Oh Sherrie: The Best of Steve Perry (2010)

EPs 
 Silver Bells (2019)

Singles

Solo

Other appearances

References

Citations

General and cited references

External links

 
 Journey Rocker Kept Sopranos Boss Waiting (archived link)
 Steve Perry interview with Stuck in the '80s podcast

1949 births
American male singer-songwriters
American rock singers
American rock songwriters
American tenors
Journey (band) members
Living people
People from Hanford, California
American people of Azorean descent
People from Lemoore, California
20th-century American singers
21st-century American singers
20th-century American writers
21st-century American writers
Singer-songwriters from California
American rock keyboardists
Fantasy Records artists
Columbia Records artists
Countertenors
American people of Portuguese descent